Novosyolovsky District is an administrative and municipal district (raion), one of the forty-three in Krasnoyarsk Krai, Russia. It is located in the southwest of the krai and borders with Balakhtinsky District in the north and east, Krasnoturansky District in the southeast, the Republic of Khakassia in the southwest and west, and with Uzhursky District in the northwest. Its administrative center is the rural locality (a selo) of Novosyolovo. Population:  16,382 (2002 Census);  The population of Novosyolovo accounts for 42.3% of the district's total population.

Geography
The Yenisey River flows through the district.

History
The district was founded on April 4, 1924.

In 1911, General Secretary of the Communist Party of the Soviet Union Konstantin Chernenko was born in the village of Bolshaya Tes, which is currently located in the district.

Divisions and government
As of 2013, the Head of the district and the Chairman of the District Council is Andrey V. Volodin.

References

Notes

Sources

Districts of Krasnoyarsk Krai
States and territories established in 1924